The Kerzhenets is a river in Nizhny Novgorod Oblast, Russia

Kerzhenets may also refer to:
Kerzhenets, Bor, a village in the urban district of Bor, Nizhny Novgorod Oblast, Russia
Kerzhenets, Semyonov, a village in the urban district of Semyonov, Nizhny Novgorod Oblast, Russia